David McKenzie (born 6 August 1974) is an Australian former racing cyclist. He won the Australian national road race title in 1998. McKenzie's biggest victory came on stage 7 of the 2000 Giro d'Italia where he rode to victory after a 164 km solo breakaway. McKenzie won the Goulburn to Sydney Classic in 2005.  He now works as a cycling journalist and commentator for Australian broadcaster SBS. He has been involved with the UCI Continental teams Black Spoke Pro Cycling Academy and EuroCyclingTrips - CMI Pro Cycling.

Major results

1994
1st Stage 1 Olympia's Tour
1995
Herald Sun Tour
1st Stages 4 & 8
1996
Herald Sun Tour
1st Stages 6a & 8a
1997
1st Stage 14 Herald Sun Tour
1998
 1st  Road race, National Road Championships
Herald Sun Tour
1st Stages 3 & 8a
1999
1st Stage 3 Tour de Langkawi
2000
1st Stage 7 Giro d'Italia
1st Stage 8 Circuito Montañes
2001
1st Stage 4 Tour de Beauce
1st Stage 6 Tour Down Under
1st Stage 1 (ITT) Herald Sun Tour
2002
2nd Grand Prix de la ville de Pérenchies
4th Overall Herald Sun Tour
1st Stages 1 (ITT) & 6
2003
1st Stage 4 Tour of Qinghai Lake
1st Stage 3 Herald Sun Tour
2004
2nd Overall Herald Sun Tour
2nd Ronde van Drenthe
2005
4th Overall Herald Sun Tour
9th Overall Tour of Japan
1st Stage 2

References

External links

1974 births
Living people
Australian male cyclists
Australian Giro d'Italia stage winners
Sportspeople from Ballarat